Benedick Bates (born November 1970) is a British actor.

He is the son of actor Alan Bates and actress Victoria Ward and trained at the London Academy of Music and Dramatic Art.

He has performed numerous times with the Glasgow Citizens Company, at the Chichester Festival Theatre and Edinburgh Festival, and in London's West End, in stage productions which include Don Carlos, Romeo and Juliet, The Return of A. J. Raffles, The Rose Tattoo, The Picture of Dorian Gray, and Semi-Monde.

In 2002, Bates made his Broadway debut opposite his father in Ivan Turgenev's Fortune's Fool.

Bates's twin brother Tristan, also an actor, died unexpectedly of an asthma-related respiratory illness in Tokyo in 1990, aged 19. Benedick Bates is a vice-president of the Tristan Bates Theatre, established at the Actors Centre in his memory.

References

External links

1971 births
Living people
English male stage actors